Roger Dudley (born between 1535 and 1545 – 1586?/1588?) was an English soldier.

Dudley was born in London, England, and may have been baptised in Yardley Hastings, Northamptonshire.  Dudley's parentage has never been satisfactorily established.  Genealogist and researcher Marshall Kirk in 1993 published the results of his exhaustive survey of the Sutton Dudley families, and came to the conclusion that Roger was the son of Henry Sutton Dudley .

Roger may also be the Roger Dudley who was matriculated as pensioner at Christ Church College, Cambridge, in 1566, but left without a degree.

It is believed that Roger married, on 8 June 1575, at Lidlington, Bedfordshire, Susannah (née Thorne), herself recorded as having been born on 5 March 1559/60 in Northamptonshire, and baptised at Yardley Hastings, the daughter of Thomas Thorne and Mary Purefoy, (the Purefoys being of noble descent).

He is reported to have been a Captain in the Earl of Leicester's militia, fighting with a commission from Elizabeth I, and under the banner of Henry of Navarre. He was thought to have died at the Battle of Ivry, France in 1590. However, the Reverend Cotton Mather of Boston wrote: "Thomas Dudley's father was Captain Roger Dudley, -- slain in the wars, when -- his son, and one only daughter were very young".   The will of Thomas Dorne (Thorne) of Yardley Hastings, Gent., dated 29 Oct 1588, bequeathed "to the children of Susan Dudley, my Daughter, widow, £10 to be equally divided". (S1, S11). Therefore, Roger was dead at the time of the will of his father-in-law, which, written in 1588, eliminates the Battle of Ivry as a possible date for his death. It is most probable that he died at the Siege of Zutphen in 1586, having followed his kinsman, Robert Dudley, 1st Earl of Leicester, who was a principal figure in that battle, which also claimed the life of Leicester's nephew Sir Philip Sidney.

Marshall K. Kirk suggests that Roger made his home after his father's death with Peter Grey, a "Queen's servant", whose manor of Segenhoe was two miles from Lidlington, (Bedfordshire), where Roger was later married.

Roger and Susannah Dudley left either five  or two (Thomas and a sister orphaned children.:

Thomas Dudley (second governor of Massachusetts Bay Colony)
Mary Dudley
Richard Dudley (b. 1583 – d. 20 Aug 1603)
Dorothy Dudley
David Dudley

Susannah is recorded as having died in 1585 during childbirth, at St. Dunstan's, London  and her name appears again three years later in a will, dated 29 October 1588, (Probate 9 May 1589), in which Thomas Thorne bequeaths... "to the Children of Susan Dudley, my Daughter..." (etc.)

Roger and Susannah Thorne Dudley's children sired a vast progeny in America . Among many others who founded or were pillars of early New England communities, William Dudley, a son of David, was the first of this line in the family of the lords of Dudley to move to Connecticut, where he founded the settlement of Guilford on the shores of Long Island Sound. He emigrated to New England sometime between 1636 and 1643, a period corresponding to his uncle Thomas's political ascendancy in Massachusetts.

Three of William Dudley's great grandsons were to give their family name to their new home in the Cornwall hills, when they moved to Owlsbury from Guilford in the mid 17th century. Owlsbury was renamed Dudleytown, and thereafter the persistent legend of America's most haunted town was born.

References

External links
"Roger Dudley Proved to be the Son of Captain Henry Dudley" : https://web.archive.org/web/20110726045518/http://www.familypage.org/RogerSonoHenry.pdf

16th-century births
16th-century deaths
Military personnel from London
16th-century English soldiers